The 2016 Rally Poland (formally the 73. PZM Rajd Polski) was the seventh round of the 2016 World Rally Championship. The event was held over four days between 30 June and 3 July 2016, and was based in Mikołajki, Poland.

Sebastian Ogier and Julien Ingrassia were the defending rally winners having won the event in the previous two seasons. Volkswagen's Andreas Mikkelsen and Anders Jæger won the rally after taking the lead in penultimate stage .It was Mikkelsen's second win in the World Rally Championship.

Entry list

Overall standings

Special stages

Power Stage
The "Power stage" was a  stage at the end of the rally.

References

Poland
Rally of Poland
Rally